HMS Falcon was a 32-gun fifth rate built at Deptford Dockyard in 1703/04. Her initial assignment was with Sir Cloudesley Shovell's Fleet. She was then assigned to the Mediterranean where she was taken by the French in 1709.

Falcon was the thirteenth vessel to bear this name since it was used for a ballinger dating from 1343 and sold in 1352.

Construction and Specifications
Falcon was ordered on 16 March 1703 to be built at Deptford Dockyard under the guidance of Master Shipwright Fisher Harding. She was launched on 2 December 1704. Her builder's measure tonnage was calculated as 411 tons (burthen).

The gun armament initially was four demi-culverins on the lower deck (LD) with two pair of guns per side. The upper deck (UD) battery would consist of between twenty and twenty-two 6-pounder guns with ten or eleven guns per side. The gun battery would be completed by four 4-pounder guns on the quarterdeck (QD) with two to three guns per side.

Commissioned Service 1702-1709
Falcon was commissioned on 1 December 1704 under the command of Captain Charles Stewart then assigned to Sir Cloudesley Shovell's Fleet. Captain Bartholomew Candler was assigned as her commander on 27 January 1706. On 30 April 1706 Captain Robert Delvall assumed command for service in the Mediterranean. Captain Delvall dies on 29 January 1708. Captain William Massam took command on 17 May 1708 and held this command until his suicide on 2 October 1708. Captain Charles Constable took command after Captain Massam's death.In consort with Pembroke. they were detached to cruise between Toulon and Corsica.

Loss
Falcon was taken along with Pembroke by a French squadron off Toulon on 29 December 1709. She struck her colours when only 16 members of her crew were left unwounded.

Notes

Citations

References

 Winfield (2009), British Warships in the Age of Sail (1603 – 1714), by Rif Winfield, published by Seaforth Publishing, England © 2009, EPUB 
 Colledge (2020), Ships of the Royal Navy, by J.J. Colledge, revised and updated by Lt Cdr Ben Warlow and Steve Bush, published by Seaforth Publishing, Barnsley, Great Britain, © 2020, EPUB 
 Lavery (1989), The Arming and Fitting of English Ships of War 1600 - 1815, by Brian Lavery, published by US Naval Institute Press © Brian Lavery 1989, Part V Guns, Type of Guns
 Clowes (1898), The Royal Navy, A History from the Earliest Times to the Present (Vol. II). London. England: Sampson Low, Marston & Company, © 1898

 

Frigates of the Royal Navy
Ships of the Royal Navy
1700s ships